The Allison T38 (company Model 501) was an early turboprop engine developed by Allison Engine Company during the late 1940s. The T38 became the basis for the very successful family of Allison T56 turboprop engine.

Design and development
Developed as a stand-alone single section of the T40 (Model 500) twin engine to aid in development of the T40, the T38 started life with a 19-stage axial compressor, eight can type combustion chambers, a 4-stage turbine driving the compressor and the extension shaft to the reduction gearbox.

Problems with gearbox vibration and combustion were dealt with during the test program and were mirrored by problems in the Allison T40 programme. The engines fitted to the Convair CV-240-21 Turboliner were rated to  equivalent.

In 1951, the United States Air Force decided that the production version of the Beechcraft XT-36 trainer—then in the mockup stage and designed for the Pratt & Whitney R-2800—would be retrofitted with the T38 when the engine entered full-scale production, which was anticipated to occur in 1955–1960. This decision ultimately doomed the aircraft, as the design changes required to accommodate the T38 delayed the project and rendered the aircraft overweight and over budget.

Although the only other aircraft slated to receive the T38 as a production engine, the Convair T-29E, was cancelled, the T38 did power a converted Convair CV-240 (the CV-240-21 Turboliner, a project that would be abandoned due to engine problems), and was fitted in the nose of the McDonnell XF-88B to drive experimental supersonic propellers. Further development of the T38 provided the power sections for the Allison T40 as well as forming the basis for the Allison T56/Model 501 and the projected Allison T39.

Variants
Model 501-B7 commercial version of the T38-A-6
XT38prototypes of the engine, single engine section of the T40, to assist in the development of the T40.
XT38-A-2
XT38-A-5 Turboprop fitted to the McDonnell XF-88B.
T38-A-6 Military version of 501-B7
T38-A-10  turboshaft version for the Piasecki YH-16A Transporter
T39 (Model 504) A projected  development of the T38 which was cancelled before hardware had been produced.
T40 (Model 500)  The  turboprop origin of the T38, composed of two power sections driving a common gearbox.
T44 (Model 503) large turboprop with three T38 engine sections.
T56 (Model 502) enlarged and improved version of the T38, destined to enter service by the tens of thousands.

Applications

 Beechcraft XT-36 (planned for retrofit; project cancelled)
 Boeing B-17 Anudderone test-bed. mounted in the nose with a 3-bladed propeller.
 Convair CV-240-21 Turboliner
 McDonnell XF-88B
 Piasecki YH-16A Transporter

Specifications (T38-A-6 / 501-B7)

See also

References

Further reading
 

T38
1950s turboshaft engines